Stempfferia baoule, the Baoule epitola, is a butterfly in the family Lycaenidae. It is found in Sierra Leone and Ivory Coast. The habitat consists of forests.

References

Butterflies described in 1999
Poritiinae